Ami Magazine ("My people") is an international news magazine that caters to the Orthodox Jewish community. It is published weekly in New York and Israel. The magazine was launched in November 2010 by Rabbi Yitzchok Frankfurter (previously Torah Editor for Mishpacha) and his wife Rechy Frankfurter (previously Mishpacha'''s American Desk Editor).

CoverageAmi has featured interviews with celebrities both Jewish and non-Jewish, including former White House Press secretaries Sean Spicer and Ari Fleischer as well as John Dean who served as White House Counsel during the Watergate scandal for United States President Richard Nixon from July 1970 until April 1973. Ami has also interviewed rabbis including Rav Yissachar Dov Rokeach (fifth Belzer rebbe), Rabbi Yisrael Horowitz of Kaliv, Rabbi Dovid Soloveitchik, Rabbi Baruch Mordechai Ezrachi, Rabbi Nissan Kaplan, Rabbi Manis Friedman, Rabbi Reuven Feinstein, and Rabbi Nosson Scherman. Ami also has had exclusive interviews with President Donald Trump, Senator Ted Cruz, Senator Marco Rubio, Newt Gingrich, Ron Paul, George Pataki, and Ben Carson.Ami's political correspondent Jake Turx became the magazine's first member of the White House press corps with the start of the Donald Trump administration. During a February 16, 2017 press briefing, Turx began asking a question about the government's response to antisemitic threats across the United States, but was stopped in mid-question by Trump, who felt he was being personally attacked and denied being antisemitic or racist. Merriam-Webster reported that searches for "anti-semitism" spiked in the week following the Trump-Turx exchange.

Some rabbis in the Williamsburg neighborhood of Brooklyn asked that Ami (along with the Jewish publications of Mishpacha and Hamodia) not be read after the magazine published a piece about Jewish religious terrorism perpetrated by Sikrikim and sympathizers of the Jerusalem-based Edah HaChareidis organization. The Satmar Rebbe of Kiryas Joel, Rav Aaron Teitelbaum, along with various other Jewish leaders, have since that time condemned some of the communities which make up the Edah HaChareidis for alleged extremism.Ami also produces a women's magazine called Ami Living and a tween magazine called Aim!. They publish a standalone food magazine Whisk that is packaged with the rest of the Ami Magazine sections, as well as Ami Business, a section in the main magazine featuring LunchBreak-interviews by Nesanel Gantz with businessmen and entrepreneurs, JTank-"the Jewish version of sharktank", and more.  The issue released in the week before a Jewish festival often include two different main magazines.

Ami journalists and writers have traveled to several continents and numerous countries, spanning North Korea, Saudi Arabia , Malta, Cuba, Iraq, the Nevada desert surrounding Area 51, Chernobyl, Afghanistan, a possible location of Mount Sinai, the burial place of Aharon HaKohen in Jordan, Murphy Ranch in California, and more.

 The Exclusive Ami Magazine Poll 

On December 11, 2019, shortly before the Impeachment trial of Donald Trump, Ami published a poll it had taken among 723 Orthodox Jews, asking five questions, four of them pertaining to the presidency of Donald Trump, with an overwhelming majority expressing themselves in favor. The first question, Do you approve of the job Donald Trump is doing as president? showed 89 percent approving, 6 percent undecided, and five percent disapproving. Answering to whether Trump should be impeached, 91 percent answered in the negative; when asked who they trusted more in regard to fighting anti-Semitism, Trump and the Republicans or Nancy Pelosi and the Democrats, 92.5 percent of those answering chose Trump and the Republicans, while 6 percent were undecided and 1.5 chose Pelosi and the Democrats; and when asked which president they felt accomplished the most for Israel's security, 82.5 percent responded with President Trump, 9.5 percent chose Ronald Reagan, with the remaining 8 percent divided among George W. Bush, George H. W. Bush, Bill Clinton, and Barack Obama. The last question asked was whether the pollees were registered as Republicans, Democrats, or Independents, and showed 39.5 percent as Republicans, 26 percent as Democrats, 16.5 as independents, ad 18 percent as unregistered.

The poll, titled The Exclusive Ami Magazine Poll, What Orthodox Jews really think about President Trump , gained much fame after Trump tweeted it.

Notable staff
 John Loftus, columnist
 Rafael Medoff, columnist 
 Rabbi Mordechai Kamenetzky (rosh yeshiva'' of Yeshiva of South Shore)
 Rabbi Moshe Taub, rabbinic editor and weekly contributor
 Rabbi Shais Taub, weekly advice columnist
 Jake Turx, White House correspondent
 Nesanel Gantz, columnist
 Shloime Zionce
 Isaac Horowitz

Controversy 
In 2014, Ami Magazine featured a positive profile of the abusive Jewish cult Lev Tahor. The article was written by Ami Magazine's Editor-in-Chief Rabbi Yitzchok Frankfurter.

References

External links
 Official website
 Zev Brenner interviews Rabbi Frankfurter, publisher of Ami magazine, on the topic of child sexual abuse within the charedi community (14 December 2011)
 "How Ami Magazine Convinced Me to Celebrate Yom HaAtzmaut"

News magazines published in the United States
Weekly magazines published in the United States
Jewish magazines published in the United States
Magazines established in 2010
Magazines published in New York City